Pennzoil is an American motor oil brand currently owned by Shell plc. The former Pennzoil Company had been established in 1913 in Pennsylvania, being active in business as an independent firm until it was acquired by Shell in 2002, becoming a brand of the conglomerate.

History

Beginning and expansion 
Origins of the company can be traced to the "South Penn Oil Company", an oil business started in Oil City, Pennsylvania by Michael Late Benedum and Joe Trees in May 1889 as a unit of Standard Oil. It became the largest oil producer in the region, becoming independent when Standard Oil was split in 1911. By those times, two companies, one on the East Coast and another on the West (founded in 1908 and 1913 respectively) started to market their motor oils under the brand Pennzoil. Their refineries and distributors were later incorporated as "The Pennzoil Company" in 1925. In 1955, South Penn Oil acquired complete ownership of Pennzoil Co.

In 1963, South Penn Oil merged with Zapata Petroleum and Stetco Petroleum to form a new "Pennzoil Company", headquartered in Houston and appointing Hugh Liedtke as president. By 1965 Pennzoil marketed its petroleum products worldwide. In 1968, United Gas Corporation was purchased by Pennzoil, through a leveraged buyout, which was necessary because Pennzoil did not have enough assets to buy United outright.

During the 1970s, the company moved its offices to the Pennzoil Place in Downtown Houston, Texas.

In 1977 a spin-off company was formed called POGO, an acronym for Pennzoil Offshore Gas Operators.

Pennzoil, Co. v. Texaco, Inc.
In 1984, Pennzoil made an informal but binding contract with Getty Oil to purchase a large portion of Getty Oil to give Pennzoil rights to Getty's oil deposits.  Following the deal, the Texaco oil company encroached on the complex merger in an attempt to acquire Getty for itself.

Pennzoil sued Texaco in Texas state court, alleging that Texaco tortiously induced Getty to breach the contract with Pennzoil.  At first it was adjudicated by Judge Anthony J.P. Farris; it was finished by visiting Judge Solomon (Sol) Casseb of San Antonio. A jury awarded Pennzoil, represented by Joe Jamail and Baine Kerr, $7.53 billion in compensatory damages and $3 billion in punitive damages. Under Texas law, Pennzoil could secure a lien on all of Texaco's property in the state, unless Texaco posted a bond that covered the judgment, interests and costs of the lawsuit (estimated to be $13 billion).

Before judgment could be entered in the Texas court and Pennzoil could obtain a lien, Texaco filed a suit in the U.S. District Court for the Southern District of New York, alleging that the Texas proceedings violated Texaco's constitutional rights. The District Court found for Texaco, and the Second Circuit affirmed. Pennzoil appealed the federal court case to the United States Supreme Court. Laurence H. Tribe argued for Pennzoil, and David Boies argued for Texaco. The Supreme Court reversed the circuit court decision, on the grounds that the federal court in New York should have abstained from interfering with the decision of a state court.

Texaco also appealed the Texas state court decision. The Texas Court of Appeals upheld the jury verdict, but found that the trial court had abused its discretion by not suggesting a remittitur (reduction of damages). It would allow the verdict to stand if Pennzoil filed a remittitur of two billion dollars, making the punitive damages award $1 billion. Compensatory damages of $7.53 billion remained unaffected. Pennzoil paid Mr. Jamail $335 million and Mr. Kerr $10 million for the victory.

After Texaco filed for bankruptcy, Pennzoil agreed to settle the case for $3 billion.

Acquisition 

In 1998, Pennzoil's motor oils, products and services divisions were spun off as an independent company, which then acquired rival Quaker State Oil Production Corporation, becoming "Pennzoil-Quaker State Company". In 1999 Pennzoil's E&P business (known as PennzEnergy) was acquired by Oklahoma City-based Devon Energy and the business now known as the Pennzoil-Quaker State Company was purchased by Royal Dutch/Shell Group to form SOPUS (an acronym for Shell Oil Products US).

Shell Oil Company (the US-based subsidiary of Shell plc) acquired Pennzoil-Quaker State company in 2002 to market its products as two separate motor oil brands, Pennzoil and Quaker State.

Gasoline 
Though not much emphasis was ever placed on gasoline by the company, Pennzoil did sell it. In the early parts of the company's history, the gas stations were branded as Pennzip, though they were later changed to Pennzoil. For decades, Pennzoil gas stations were mostly marketed in western Pennsylvania, western New York, northern and eastern Ohio, and northern West Virginia.

In the 1990s, Pennzoil gas experienced a bit of a revival when Pittsburgh area convenience store chain Cogo's began co-branding themselves with Pennzoil. The co-branding lasted only a few years, and Cogo's switched brands to BP and Exxon in 2001.

After Shell's purchase of Pennzoil, there was the possibility that the remaining Pennzoil stations—mostly in western Pennsylvania—would be converted to Shell as part of the company's aggressive movement to expand nationally. This didn't happen, but the three company-owned Pennzoil gas stations in the New Castle, Pennsylvania, area began co-branding themselves with 7-Eleven in 2003, with more emphasis placed on the 7-Eleven brand name than Pennzoil itself.

Gradually, BP began replacing Pennzoil at some of these sites in 2006 while retaining 7-Eleven (a Pennzoil in Ambridge, Pennsylvania, also converted to BP at the same time) while others were sold to private owners and became independent, unbranded locations. By the mid-2010s, Pennzoil was no longer selling gasoline.

Commercial automotive and motorcycle partnerships 
Pennzoil is an official long-term recommended motor oil of all Fiat Chrysler Automobiles companies (including all of brands and subsidiaries), BMW, Mini, Rolls-Royce, Hyundai, Chevrolet (shared with Mobil 1 and Valvoline), Ferrari, Iveco and Opel (shared with Mobil 1) for automobiles in United States. Pennzoil is also an official long-term recommended motorcycle engine oil of BMW Motorrad and Ducati for motorcycles in United States.

Motorsports 

USAC National Championship drivers Al Unser and Johnny Rutherford were sponsored by Pennzoil in the Chaparral team. Rutherford won the Indianapolis 500 and the championship in 1980. From 1983 to 1990, Pennzoil sponsored the Team Penske driver Rick Mears during his CART World Series campaign, winning the 1984 and 1988 Indianapolis 500. From 1998 to 2001, Nismo in JGTC was sponsored by Pennzoil (through Itochu, who owned the brand's rights in Japan), winning the 1998 and 1999 GT500 titles. IndyCar Series driver Sam Hornish Jr. drove for Pennzoil-sponsored Panther Racing from 2001 to 2003. Since 2011, Team Penske driver Hélio Castroneves has been sponsored part-time by Pennzoil, most notably at the Indianapolis 500. Pennzoil's yellow car livery has been nicknamed the "Yellow Submarine".

In the NASCAR Cup Series, Dale Earnhardt, Inc. had a Pennzoil sponsorship for Steve Park in their No.1 car from 1998 to 2003. Richard Childress Racing driver Kevin Harvick had a Pennzoil sponsorship from 2007 to 2010. Penske Racing took over the Pennzoil sponsorship in 2011 with Kurt Busch and in 2012, it was moved over to A. J. Allmendinger and to Joey Logano in 2013. Starting in 2018, Pennzoil has sponsored the Las Vegas Monster Energy NASCAR Cup Series spring race, Pennzoil 400.

Pennzoil was the title sponsor of the Grand Prix of Houston in 2013. Pennzoil also has been the official motor oil of German-American GTLM team BMW Team Rahal Letterman Lanigan Racing since 2015 season and also American Formula One team Haas F1 Team since 2016 season. Pennzoil sponsors NHRA's Don Schumacher Racing and drivers Matt Hagan (Funny Car) and Leah Pruett (Top Fuel). They also sponsor driver Ken Block, best known for his Gymkhana series on YouTube.

Pennzoil also partnered Formula One team Scuderia Ferrari and MotoGP team Ducati Team due to Shell partnership.

See also

Getty Oil
Jiffy Lube
Shell Oil Company
Quaker State

References

External links 

 

1963 establishments in Pennsylvania
2002 mergers and acquisitions
American companies established in 1963
American companies disestablished in 2002
Automotive fuel retailers
Chemical companies of the United States
Companies based in Houston
Companies based in Venango County, Pennsylvania
Defunct oil companies of the United States
Energy companies established in 1963
Motor oils
Shell plc brands